French Argentines are Argentines of full or partial French descent, or French-born people who reside in Argentina. Most of French immigrants settled in Argentina from the 1870s until WW1, though consistent immigration started in the 1820s and continued until the late 1940s. Half of these immigrants came from Southwestern France, especially from the Basque Country and Béarn (former Basses-Pyrénées accounted for more than 20% of immigrants), as well as Bigorre and Rouergue, but also from Savoy and the Paris region. As early as in the 1840s, Argentina also received immigrants with French background from neighboring countries, notably Uruguay. In 2006, it was estimated that around 6 million Argentines had some degree of French ancestry (up to 17% of the total population).

Business
, CEO of Ledesma, with distant French ancestry through his maternal great-grandparents
Alfredo Fortabat, founder of Loma Negra, born to French parents
, landowner and entrepreneur, born to French father
, French-born industrialist and inventor
Federico Lacroze, businessman who created the first railway system in Argentina, born to French father
María Amalia Lacroze de Fortabat, businesswoman and art collector, with distant French ancestry through her paternal great-grandfather
, entrepreneur and philanthropist, daughter of Amalia Lacroze de Fortabat, with remote French ancestry through both lines of her family
Anacarsis Lanús, entrepreneur considered one of the wealthiest men in Argentina in the 1850s, born to French father 
Juan Carlos Lectoure, owner of Luna Park arena
Guy Count Maingard, Noble French-born Businessman married to Delia Alvarez de Toledo
, businessman who created the first hunting reserve in Argentina, born to French parents
, French-born businessman

Education
, professor and researcher
, engineer and professor
, lawyer and professor, with distant French ancestry through both lines of his family
José Manuel Estrada, professor and thinker, with French ancestry through his maternal grandparents
Amédée Jacques, French-born pedagogue and philosopher
, economist and professor, with French ancestry through his paternal grandfather
Ernesto Laclau, political theorist
, engineer who founded the first Industrial School in Argentina
, philosopher and professor
, French-born jurist and professor
, professor
Jacques de Mahieu, French-born anthropologist and professor, Nazi collaborator in Vichy France who fled to Argentina through the ratlines
, professor and dean of the Journalism Faculty of the National University of La Plata, Deputy of Buenos Aires Province since 2017
, professor of cinema and philosophy
, lawyer and professor

Entertainment

Actors
, theater and film actor
Alberto Anchart, actor
, actress
Gogó Andreu, actor, with French ancestry through his mother's line
Tono Andreu, film actor, with French ancestry through his mother's line
María Armand, actress
, actress
Alberto Barcel, actor
Pablo Bardauil, film actor and director
Lola Berthet, TV series and telenovelas actress
, actor, born in Uruguay 
, theater actor and director, son of César Bertrand
Héctor Bidonde, actor and director
, actress
Beatriz Bonnet, actress, awarded with five Martín Fierro Awards throughout her career on television
, actor
, actress
, theater actor, born to French parents 
Segundo Cernadas, telenovela actor, with remote French ancestry through his maternal great-great-great-grandparents
, actor
, actor
, theater actor
, actor
Gastón Dalmau, actor and singer known for his role in soap opera Casi Ángeles
, actress
, actress
, theater actor and director, born to French parents
, actress
, actor
Zoe Ducós, actress
, actress
Ulises Dumont, film, television and theater actor
, actress, niece of Nancy Dupláa, with remote French ancestry through her paternal great-great-grandparents
Nancy Dupláa, actress, with distant French ancestry through her paternal great-grandparents
, actor
, actress
, actress
, actor
, actress
Maurice Jouvet, French-born film actor
, actress, daughter of Maurice Jouvet
, radio and film actor
Lydia Lamaison, actress
Libertad Lamarque, film actress, born to French Uruguayan father
Esteban Lamothe, actor
Claudia Lapacó, actress and singer, born to French mother
Víctor Laplace, film actor
, model and actress
, actress
Pedro Laxalt, French-born film actor
, actress
, actress
Mona Maris, actress, born to French father
Victoria Maurette, actress and singer, known for her role in telenovela Rebelde Way
Jean Pierre Noher, French-born film and television actor
Michel Noher, TV series actor, son of Jean Pierre Noher
Barry Norton, actor, born to French Uruguayan father and French mother
Aída Olivier, actress and dancer
, actress
, actor
, actress
Malena Pichot, stand-up comedian and actress
Jean Pierre Reguerraz, actor, born to French parents
, actress, granddaughter of Ambar La Fox
, TV series actor
, actress
George Rigaud, actor, born to French mother
, actor
Beatriz Thibaudin, actress
, actress, with French ancestry through her maternal grandfather
, actor and playwright

Musicians
Eduardo Arolas, tango bandoneon player, born to French parents
Susana Baron Supervielle, musician, born to French father and French Uruguayan mother
, rock singer
, singer and actor, son of Moris Birabent
Mauricio "Moris" Birabent, rock musician
, rock singer
, musician from rock band Arco Iris
Fabiana Cantilo, rock singer, with remote French ancestry through both lines of her family
, musician, son of César Bertrand
, tango singer
, Christian rock singer
, guitarist
Sol Gabetta, cellist, born to French mother
Carlos Gardel, French-born singer and actor, considered the most famous figure of tango
Carlos Guichandut, opera singer 
, musician
Víctor Heredia, folk singer
, singer, born to French father
, rock guitarist, son of René Jolivet
Pocho Lapouble, jazz drummer and composer
David Lebón, rock singer, with French ancestry on his father's side
Paz Lenchantin, bass guitarist of The Pixies
, opera singer, born to French father
Sandra Mihanovich, rock singer, daughter of Mónica Cahen D'Anvers, with French ancestry through her maternal grandfather
, conductor and composer, with French ancestry on his father's line
, bass guitarist from pop band Tan Biónica
, singer from pop band Tan Biónica
Fernando Otero, pianist and composer, with French ancestry through his maternal grandfather
Paula Nenette Pepin, French-born composer and pianist
, pop-rock singer, with remote French ancestry through his paternal great-great-great-grandfather
Rodrigo Ratier, composer and pianist
Mercedes Sosa, folk singer, with French ancestry through her maternal grandfather
, musician from rock band Vox Dei

Other entertainers
Harry d'Abbadie d'Arrast, film director and screenwriter, born to French father
Ambar La Fox, vedette
Manuel Antín, film director and screenwriter
Valeria Archimó, theater dancer and choreographer
, French-born vedette
, journalist and TV host
, TV sports reporter
Mónica Cahen D'Anvers, journalist and TV host, born to French father
Paulette Christian, French-born vedette and actress
Esteban Courtalón, cinematographer
, model and TV host
, French-born film director and set designer
, model and TV host, with remote French ancestry through her paternal great-great-grandparents
, model who disappeared during the last dictatorship, born to French parents
Baby Etchecopar, radio and TV host
Valentina Ferrer, model and Argentina pageant at 2014 Miss Universe
, movie producer and screenwriter
, TV host
, radio and TV host
, film critic and director
, radio and TV host
, journalist and TV host
, French-born vedette
Pampita, model
Ivo Pelay, playwright
, journalist and TV host
Eugène Py, French-born cameraman, cinematographer and film director, considered the founding pioneer of Argentine cinema
Reina Reech, dancer and choreographer, daughter of Ambar La Fox
Juan Carlos Rousselot, announcer and TV host
Jérôme Savary, director, born to French father
Daniel Tinayre, French-born film director, screenwriter and producer
, TV host, daughter of Daniel Tinayre
Paulina Trotz, model, with French ancestry through her mother's line

Explorers and pioneers
Clément Cabanettes, French-born co-founder of Pigüé
Augusto Lasserre, founder of Ushuaia, born to French father
Pedro Luro, French-born rancher and pioneer settler in the southern Pampas
Ernest Rouquaud, French-born merchant and explorer in Patagonia

Journalism
Ana Baron, journalist, with French ancestry through her paternal grandparents
, journalist
, journalist
, journalist and research scientist
, journalist and theater critic
Gabriela Laperrière de Coni, French-born journalist and public health activist
, journalist
Charles Lescat, far-right newspaper editor and journalist, Nazi collaborator under German-occupied France, born to French parents
, journalist
Susana Viau, journalist and political columnist

Laws and politics

Activists
, human rights activist whose three sons disappeared during the last dictatorship
, lawyer of the ERP and activist who was killed by the Triple A
, lawyer and activist
Eduardo Héctor Garat, activist with Montoneros who disappeared during the last dictatorship

Deputies and senators
, Deputy and interim Governor of Catamarca, with French ancestry through his paternal grandfather
Uladislao Augier, Deputy of Catamarca, with French ancestry through his paternal grandfather
, Deputy of Buenos Aires (1898-1904), member of the Argentine Industrial Union, born to French parents
Enzo Bordabehere, Senator of Santa Fe
Pedro Braillard Poccard, Senator of Corrientes since 2015
Juan Fernando Brügge, Deputy of Córdoba since 2015, with French ancestry through his mother's line
Juan Cabandié, Deputy of Buenos Aires since 2013 and human rights activist
, Senator of Buenos Aires (1882-1889), born to French father 
Albor Cantard, Deputy of Santa Fe since 2017
Alberto María Fonrouge, Senator of Buenos Aires Province (1973-1976), with distant French ancestry through his paternal great-grandfather
, Senator of Mendoza from 1986 to 2001
, Deputy of Buenos Aires from 1896 to 1906
, Deputy in the Mercosur Parliament for Argentina since 2016, Deputy of Buenos Aires (1998-1999)
, Senator (1983-1987), Governor (1987-1991) and Deputy (1991-1995) of Corrientes, with distant French ancestry through his paternal French Brazilian great-grandfather 
, Deputy of Buenos Aires since 2017
Rodolfo Tailhade, Deputy of Buenos Aires since 2015
Gerónimo Vargas Aignasse, Deputy of Tucumán from 2003 to 2011
Guillermo Vargas Aignasse, Senator of Tucumán from 1973 until his disappearance in 1976

Diplomats
, diplomat, with French ancestry through his paternal grandfather
, diplomat, with French ancestry through his paternal grandfather
, diplomat

Military junta
, de facto Federal Interventor of Misiones from 1959 to 1962
, de facto Minister of Foreign Affairs and Worship (1931-1932), born to French parents 
, de facto Interventor of Buenos Aires from 1955 to 1958
, de facto Minister of Defense (1969-1972), with French ancestry through his maternal grandparents 
Carlos Chasseing, de facto Federal Interventor of Córdoba from 1976 to 1979
, de facto Judge of the Supreme Court, with distant French ancestry through his paternal great-grandparents
, de facto Minister of Justice (1969-1970)
, de facto Minister of Justice (1944-1945), with French ancestry through his paternal grandfather 
, de facto Federal Interventor of Misiones from June to October 1962
Raúl Lacabanne, de facto Federal Interventor of Córdoba from 1974 to 1975
Carlos Lacoste, interim de facto President of Argentina from 11 to 21 December 1981
Alejandro Agustín Lanusse, de facto President from 1971 to 1973, with distant French ancestry through his paternal great-grandfather
, de facto Minister of Defense (1966-1967), with distant French ancestry through his paternal great-grandfather
, de facto Minister of Defense (March to April 1962), de facto Minister of Agriculture (1972-1973), with distant French ancestry through his paternal great-grandfather
, de facto Minister of Education (1969-1970)
, de facto Minister of Justice (1970-1971)
Alfredo Saint-Jean, interim de facto President of Argentina from 18 June to 1 July 1982
, de facto Governor of Buenos Aires from 1976 to 1981
Lorenzo Sigaut, de facto Minister of Economy (1981)

Ministers
, Minister of Navy under Hipólito Yrigoyen (1916-1919), President of the National Bank from 1921 to 1924, born to French mother
, Minister of Economy under Julio Argentino Roca (1900-1901), born to French parents 
Onofre Betbeder, twice Minister of Navy under Julio Argentino Roca (1901-1904) and José Figueroa Alcorta (1906-1910), born to French father
Amado Boudou, Minister of Economy (2009-2011) and Vice President (2011-2015) under Cristina Fernández de Kirchner, with French ancestry through his paternal grandfather
Patricia Bullrich, Minister of Security under Mauricio Macri since 2015, with remote French ancestry through her maternal great-great-grandparents
, Minister of Agriculture under Agustín P. Justo (1933-1935), born to French parents 
, Minister of Public Services under Juan Perón (1952-1955)
, Minister of Foreign Affairs and Worship under Arturo Frondizi (1961-1962)
, Minister of Agriculture under Mauricio Macri since 2017, with remote French ancestry through his paternal great-great-great-grandfather
Jorge Faurie, Minister of Foreign Affairs under Mauricio Macri since 2017
, Minister of Justice and Public Instruction under Juan Domingo Perón (1946-149)
, Minister of Agriculture under Marcelo T. de Alvear (1922-1925)
Martín Lousteau, Minister of Economy under Cristina Fernández de Kirchner (2007-2008)
, Minister of Public Works under Roque Sáenz Peña (1913-1914), with French ancestry through his maternal grandfather
Honorio Pueyrredón, Minister of Agriculture (1916-1917), Minister of Foreign Affairs and Worship (1917-1922) under Hipólito Yrigoyen, with distant French ancestry through his paternal great-grandfather
, Minister of Finance under Hipólito Yrigoyen (1916-1922), born to French father
Juan Vital Sourrouille, Minister of Economy under Raúl Alfonsín (1985-1989), with French ancestry through his paternal grandparents

Presidents
Carlos Pellegrini, President of Argentina from 1890 to 1892, born to French father 
Juan Perón, twice President of Argentina from 1946 to 1955, and from 1973 to 1974, with French ancestry through his French Uruguayan paternal grandmother
Roque Sáenz Peña, President of Argentina from 1910 to 1914, with French ancestry through his French Uruguayan maternal grandfather
Hipólito Yrigoyen, twice President of Argentina from 1916 to 1922, and from 1928 to 1930, born to French father

Provincial representatives
, Governor of San Luis from 1917 to 1921, born to French father 
, Governor of Chaco from 1929 to 1930
Gustavo Bordet, Governor of Entre Ríos since 2015
, Governor of Neuquén from 1903 to 1906
, Governor of Santa Cruz from 1949 to 1952, with French ancestry through his paternal grandmother
, provisional Governor of Jujuy in 1879, born to French father
, Deputy (1896-1900) then Governor (1919-1921) of Corrientes
José Camilo Crotto, Governor of Buenos Aires from 1918 to 1921, born to French mother
, Governor of San Luis from 1913 to 1917, son of Mauricio Daract, with French ancestry through his paternal grandfather
Justo Daract, six times Governor of San Luis between 1854 and 1867, born to French father
, twice Governor of San Luis between 1852 and 1854, born to French father
, twice Governor of Salta from 1952 to 1955, and from 1963 to 1966
, Governor of Entre Ríos from 1931 to 1935, with French ancestry through his paternal grandfather
, Governor of San Luis from 1922 to 1926, born to French parents
, Governor of Chaco from 1911 to 1914, with French ancestry through his paternal grandfather
, Governor of Misiones from 1896 to 1905, born to French father
Mario Moine, Governor of Entre Ríos from 1991 to 1995
, Governor of La Pampa from 1949 to 1951
, Governor of Tucumán from 1932 to 1934, with distant French ancestry through his paternal great-grandfather
, Governor of Tucumán from 1906 to 1909, with French ancestry through his paternal grandfather
, Governor (1880-1882) and Senator (1883-1892) of Tucumán, born to French father
Horacio Rodríguez Larreta, Chief of Government of Buenos Aires since 2015, with remote French ancestry on his father's side
, Governor of Tucumán from 1928 to 1930, born to French parents
Carlos Sylvestre Begnis, twice Governor of Santa Fe from 1958 to 1962, and from 1973 to 1976
Arístides Villanueva, Governor of Mendoza from 1870 to 1873, with remote French ancestry through his maternal great-great-grandfather

Public figures
María Lorenza Barreneche, First Lady of Argentina from 1983 to 1989, with distant French ancestry through her maternal great-grandfather
, First Lady of Argentina from 1963 to 1966, with distant French ancestry through her paternal great-grandfather
Queen Máxima of the Netherlands, queen consort of the Netherlands, with remote French ancestry through her maternal great-great-grandparents 
Pilar Nores de García, twice First Lady of Peru from 1985 to 1990, and from 2006 to 2011, with distant French ancestry through her maternal great-grandparents
Eva Perón, First Lady of Argentina from 1946 to 1952, with French ancestry through her paternal grandparents

Other politicians
Ignacio Álvarez Thomas, military commander and politician of the early 19th century, with French ancestry through his maternal grandfather
Juan Agustín Augier, Unitarian politician, with French ancestry through his paternal grandfather
, student leader
Julián Bourdeu, French-born politician and justice of the peace
, judge of the Supreme Court of Justice, with French ancestry through his paternal grandfather
Leandro Despouy, human rights lawyer and politician
Che Guevara, major figure of the Cuban Revolution, with remote French ancestry through his maternal great-great-grandfather
, politician, born in Uruguay to French father
, lawyer and Federal Interventor of Santiago del Estero from 2004 to 2005
Santiago de Liniers, French-born officer and viceroy of the Río de la Plata 
Alejo Peyret, French-born politician and writer
Juan Martín de Pueyrredón, general and politician of the early 19th century, born to French father
José Rondeau, political figure of the Argentine War of Independence, born to French father
Luis Vernet, Governor of the Malvinas Islands (1829-1831), born in Germany in a French Huguenot family
, student leader, born to French father

Literature
Carlos Alvarado-Larroucau, writer
, writer, son of Raúl Barón Biza, with distant French ancestry through his paternal great-grandfather
, writer, with French ancestry through his paternal grandfather
Odile Baron Supervielle, writer, born in Uruguay to French father and French Uruguayan mother
, writer, with French ancestry through her paternal grandparents
Augusto Belin, writer, born in Chile to French father
Adolfo Bioy Casares, writer, with French ancestry through his paternal grandparents
Ivonne Bordelois, poet and writer
Silvina Bullrich, novelist, with remote French ancestry through her maternal great-great-great-grandfather
Eugenio Cambaceres, writer, born to French father 
Andrés Chabrillón, poet, born to French parents
, poet, born to French father
Julio Cortázar, writer, with French ancestry through his maternal grandfather
, writer and journalist, born in Brazil to French parents
, French-born writer
, novelist and essayist, son of Emilio Daireaux, with French ancestry through his paternal grandparents
, poet
Juan Filloy, writer, born to French mother
, poet and novelist, born to French mother
, poet and writer
Paul Groussac, French-born writer, literary critic, historian and librarian
José Hernández, poet and author of Martín Fierro, which is considered Argentina's national book, with distant French ancestry through his maternal great-grandfather 
Arturo Jauretche, writer, with French ancestry through his paternal grandfather and his maternal French Brazilian grandmother
Federico Jeanmaire, writer
Gregorio de Laferrère, playwright, born to French father
Roberto de Laferrère, writer, son of Gregorio de Laferrère
, writer and literary critic
Ana Emilia Lahitte, writer
Nydia Lamarque, poet
, writer
Leopoldo Marechal, writer, born to French Uruguayan father
Julio Meinvielle, priest and writer
Conrado Nalé Roxlo, writer, born in a French Uruguayan family
Silvina Ocampo, poet and writer, with remote French ancestry through her maternal great-great-great-grandfather
Victoria Ocampo, writer, with remote French ancestry through her maternal great-great-great-grandfather
Elvira Orphée, writer
Ulyses Petit de Murat, poet and screenwriter
Manuel Peyrou, writer
, French-born anarchist writer
, French-born playwright
, philosopher, born to French father
Susana Thénon, avant-garde poet
, poet, born to French mother

Military
, soldier who fought during the Paraguayan War
Hipólito Bouchard, French-born sailor and militar who fought during the Argentine War of Independence
Federico de Brandsen, French-born colonel who fought in the wars for independence
Jorge Cáceres, former chief of the Argentine Federal Police, assassinated by the leftist terrorist group Montoneros, with French ancestry through his maternal grandparents
Héctor Canavery, lieutenant in the Argentine Army who took part in the Conquest of the Desert, with French ancestry through his maternal grandfather
, soldier who fought in the Cisplatine War and in the Argentine Civil Wars, with distant French ancestry through his paternal great-grandfather
, navy commander, with French ancestry through his maternal grandfather
, vice admiral of the Argentine Navy, former de facto Minister of Navy, with French ancestry through his paternal grandparents
, soldier involved in the 1943 Argentine coup d'état
, sailor, born to French father
, aviator who died during the South Atlantic Conflict
, French-born sailor who fought during the Argentine Civil Wars
, French-born sailor who fought during the Cisplatine War and the Uruguayan Civil War
, French-born sailor who fought during the Argentine War of Independence and the Argentine Civil Wars
Esteban Mestivier, French-born Military and Civil commander in the Malvinas Islands
, French-born soldier
, soldier
, French-born interim Commander of the Malvinas Islands (1833)

Religion
, Bishop of Tucumán
Moisés Julio Blanchoud, Catholic prelate
Fermín Emilio Lafitte, French-born Archbishop of Córdoba
Esteban María Laxague, Bishop of Viedma
, Bishop of Zárate-Campana
Eduardo O'Gorman, Catholic priest, with French ancestry through his paternal grandmother

Science
, gynecologist
José Antonio Balseiro, physicist, with French ancestry through his maternal grandparents
, French-born astronomer
, agronomist and soil scientist
Aimé Bonpland, French-born botanist
Auguste Bravard, French-born palaeontologist
, engineer, born to French mother
Catherine Cesarsky, French-born astronomer
, physician, born to French parents
, nutritionist, with French ancestry through his paternal grandfather
, natural scientist and conservationist, with French ancestry through his maternal grandmother
Enrique Hermitte, engineer
Bernardo Houssay, physiologist, Nobel Prize winner (1947), born to French parents
, French-born zoologist
Luis Federico Leloir, doctor and biochemist, Nobel Prize winner (1970), born in France to Argentine parents who both had French ancestry
, physician
, French-born chemist and pioneer of photography
, physician, son of Bartolomé Loudet and a French Argentine mother
, physician, son of Bartolomé Loudet and a French Argentine mother
, physician, son of Osvaldo Loudet
Alicia Lourteig, botanist, born to French father
Alicia Moreau de Justo, physician, born in Great Britain to French parents
Enrique Pichon-Rivière, psychiatrist, born in Switzerland to French parents
Adela Ringuelet, astrophysicist and astronomer
Raúl Adolfo Ringuelet, zoologist
Emilio Solanet, research scientist who improved the Argentine Criollo horse, born to French father 
, engineer, born to French father

Sports

Auto racing
, racing driver
Comte George Raphaël Béthenod de Montbressieux, racing driver, born to French father
Juan Manuel Bordeu, racing driver
Sacha Fenestraz, French-born racing driver
Carlos Menditeguy, racing driver and polo player, born to French Uruguayan father and French Argentine mother

Field hockey
Manuel Brunet, field hockey player
Carla Dupuy, field hockey player
Juan Pablo Hourquebie, field hockey player
Mercedes Margalot, field hockey player
Gonzalo Peillat, field hockey player
Victoria Sauze, field hockey player
María Alejandra Tucat, field hockey player

Football
Nicolás Abot, football player
Mariano Berriex, football player
Fernando Bonjour, football player
Martín Bonjour, football player
Luis Alberto Bonnet, football player
Jorge Bontemps, football player
, football player
Héctor de Bourgoing, football player
Martín Bouvier, football player
Lucas Boyé, football player
Mario Boyé, football player
, football player
Darío Cabrol, football player
, football player
, football player
Christian Cellay, football player
José Chamot, football player
Nereo Champagne, football player
Nestor Combin, football player
, football player, son of Pedro Coudannes
, football player
Eduardo Coudet, football player
, football player
Walter Coyette, football player
Facundo Curuchet, football player
Ceferino Denis, football player
Germán Denis, football player
Héctor Desvaux, football player
Alfredo Di Stéfano, football player, with French ancestry through his maternal grandfather
, football player
Matías Donnet, football player
Sebastián Dubarbier, football player
Juan Eluchans, football player
Tulio Etchemaite, football player
Carlos Alberto Etcheverry, football player
Iván Etevenaux, football player
Francisco Feuillassier, football player
, football player
Santiago Fusilier, football player
Pablo Garnier, football player
Patricio Gómez Barroche, football player
Luciano Goux, football player
Marcelo Goux, football player
Federico Higuaín, football player, son of Jorge Higuaín
Gonzalo Higuaín, French-born football player, son of Jorge Higuaín
Jorge Higuaín, football player, with distant French ancestry
Juan Imbert, football player
Jonathan Jacquet, football player
Cristian Jeandet, football player
, football player
, football player
Julio César Laffatigue, football player
César-Auguste Laraignée, football player
Pedro Larraquy, football player
Joaquín Larrivey, football player
Mariana Larroquette, football player
Christian Limousin, football player
José María Lorant, football player and coach
Félix Loustau, football player
Juan Carlos Loustau, football referee
Patricio Loustau, football referee
, football player
Oscar Malbernat, football player
, football player
Juan Maraude, football player
Julio Marchant, football player
Juan Ignacio Mercier, football player
Pablo Mouche, football player
Luciano Nequecaur, football player
, football player
Ricardo Noir, football player
, football player
Catriel Orcellet, football player
Oscar Passet, football player
Carlos Peucelle, football player
, football player
Jonathan Phillippe, football player
Cristian Piarrou, football player
Ángel Rambert, football player, with French ancestry through his paternal grandfather
Sebastián Rambert, football player, son of Ángel Rambert, with distant French ancestry through his paternal grandfather
Jonathan Felipe Rougier, football player
Matías Sarraute, football player
Luis Solignac, football player 
Joaquín Susvielles, football player
, football player
Juan Carlos Trebucq, football player
David Trezeguet, French-born football player, son of Jorge Trezeguet, with remote French ancestry through his paternal great-great-grandfather
Jorge Trezeguet, football player, with distant French ancestry through his paternal great-grandfather
Carlos Trullet, football player
, football player

Handball
Sebastien Dechamps, handball player
, handball player
Diego Simonet, handball player
Pablo Simonet, handball player
Sebastián Simonet, handball player

Rugby
Alejandro Abadie, rugby player
Santiago Álvarez Fourcade, rugby player
Guillermo Angaut, rugby player
Gonzalo Bertranou, rugby player
José Cilley, rugby player
Martín Durand, rugby player
Juan Cruz Guillemaín, rugby player
Daniel Hourcade, rugby coach and former player
Eduardo Laborde, rugby player
Ignacio Larrague, rugby player
Ricardo Le Fort, rugy player
Agustín Pichot, rugby player
, rugby player
Joaquín Tuculet, rugby player
Alberto Vernet Basualdo, rugby player

Swimming
Alberto Bourdillón, swimmer
Jeannette Campbell, French-born swimmer
Alejandro Lecot, swimmer
Jorge Moreau, swimmer
Leopoldo Tahier, swimmer

Tennis
Mailen Auroux, tennis player
Carlos Berlocq, tennis player
Marcelo Charpentier, tennis player
José Luis Clerc, tennis player
Sebastián Decoud, tennis player

Other sports
José Manuel Brunet, fencer
Carmelo Camet, French-born fencer, son of Francisco Camet
Francisco Camet, fencer
Gabriel Curuchet, road bicycle racer and track cyclist
Juan Curuchet, road bicycle racer and track cyclist
Juan Carlos Dasque, sport shooter
Roberto Luis Debarnot, chess player
Vito Dumas, single-handed sailor
Amelia Fournel, sport shooter
Carlos Guimard, chess player
, polo player
, polo player
Eduardo Lausse, boxer
, French-born Basque pelota player, inventor of 
Lucien Petit-Breton, French-born racing cyclist
Alan Pichot, chess player
, sailboat racer
Roberto Viau, basketball player

Visual arts

Architects
 Pedro Benoit, architect, born to French father
 , French-born architect
 , French-born architect and engineer
 , French-born architect who designed the Palacio Duhau
 , French-born architect and painter
 , architect
 , architect and designer
 Eduardo Le Monnier, French-born architect
 , architect, born to French parents
 Patricio Pouchulu, architect

Comic book artists
Louis Cazeneuve, comic book artist
Liniers, cartoonist
Caloi, cartoonist
, cartoonist, born to French father
, cartoonist, son of Caloi

Painters
Numa Ayrinhac, French-born painter
Norma Bessouet, painter
, French-born painter
Gustavo Cochet, painter, born to French father
Julio Ducuron, painter, with French ancestry through his paternal grandfather
Fernando Fader, French-born painter
, French-born painter
Julio Le Parc, painter and sculptor, with French ancestry through his paternal grandfather 
, painter, with remote French ancestry through his maternal great-great-grandfather
Charles Pellegrini, French-born painter and engineer
Prilidiano Pueyrredón, painter, architect, and engineer, with French ancestry through his paternal grandfather
Guillermo Roux, painter, born to French Uruguayan father

Other visual artists
Adolfo Bellocq, printmaker
, French-born photographer
Esteban Gonnet, French-born photographer
Carlos Thays, French-born landscape architect

Other
, president of Mozarteum Argentino, with French ancestry through her mother's line
, librarian who promoted the use of the Universal Decimal Classification in Argentina, born in Uruguay to French parents
Jorge Romero Brest, art critic, with French ancestry through his maternal grandmother
Matilde Díaz Vélez, urbanist and philanthropist, with French ancestry through her maternal grandmother
Gato Dumas, chef, with distant French ancestry through both lines of his family 
, French-born chef
Anna Larroucau Laborde de Lucero, French-born educator and philanthropist
Augusto S. Mallié, historian and director of the National General Archive, born to French father
Camila O'Gorman, 19th century socialite, with French ancestry through her paternal grandmother
Marie Anne Périchon de Vandeuil, French-born 19th century socialite, known to be the mistress of viceroy Santiago de Liniers
, French-born landowner
, historian

See also
French immigration to Argentina

References

Immigration to Argentina
Argentine people of French descent
French
Argentine
French